Gwong people (Hausa: Kagoma) are a people found in the southern part of Kaduna State, Nigeria. Their language, Gyong language belongs to the central plateau language group. Their headquarters is at Fadan Kagoma, Jema'a Local Government Area of the state.

Distribution
The Gwong people are mainly found in Jema'a Local Government Area of southern Kaduna State, Nigeria.

Religion
The Gwong people are predominantly Christians who make up about 78.00% of the population (of whom Protestants number about 60.00%, Roman Catholics 20.00% and Independent 20.00%). The remaining 22.00% of the overall population being adherents of traditional religion.

Language

Politics
The Gwong people's realm is called Gwong Chiefdom and its rulers are known by the appellation Kpop. The current monarch is His Royal Highness (HRH) Col. Paul Zakka Wyom (rtd.), Kpop Gwong II.

HRH Paul Wyom conferred an eighteen year old Briton with a traditional title for building a health centre

Notable people
Bishop Joseph Danlami Bagobiri, late catholic bishop of Kafanchan.
 Victor Moses, footballer
Sir Patrick Ibrahim Yakowa (late), first civilian governor of Kaduna State from Southern Kaduna.
Lt. Gen. Luka Nyeh Yusuf (late), former Nigerian Chief of Army Staff.

References

Ethnic groups in Nigeria